Nel sole is a 1967 Italian "musicarello" film directed by Aldo Grimaldi. The title is a reference to the Al Bano's hit song with the same name.

Cast 
 Al Bano: Carlo Carrera
Romina Power: Lorena Vivaldi
Linda Christian: Laura Vivaldi
Franco Franchi: Franco Sparapaoli
Ciccio Ingrassia: Ciccio
Carlo Giordana: Giorgio Castelli
Hélène Chanel: Ivana Vannucci
Antonella Steni: Teacher of Art History
Nino Taranto: Professor of Physics
Mirella Pamphili: Attilia
Enrico Montesano: Francesco Alessandroni
Loretta Goggi: Cantini
Enzo Maggio: Giacomo
Vincenzo Crocitti: Student

References

External links

1967 films
Musicarelli
1967 musical comedy films
Films directed by Aldo Grimaldi
Titanus films
Films with screenplays by Giovanni Grimaldi
1960s Italian-language films
1960s Italian films